Devin Tyler (born July 2, 1986) is an American football offensive lineman who is a free agent. He attended Suitland High School in Forestville, Maryland and played college football at Temple University. He has been a member of the Arizona Cardinals, Baltimore Ravens, Saskatchewan Roughriders, Edmonton Eskimos and Winnipeg Blue Bombers.

Professional career
Tyler was signed by the Arizona Cardinals of the National Football League (NFL) on April 25, 2010.
He was released on July 27, 2010. He was signed by the Baltimore Ravens of the NFL on August 1, 2010.
Tyler was released by the Ravens on September 4, 2010. He signed with the Saskatchewan Roughriders of the Canadian Football League (CFL) in May 2011. He was released by the Roughriders in June 2011. Tyler was signed by the CFL's Edmonton Eskimos on August 15, 2011. He played in 22 games with the Eskimos during the 2011 and 2012 seasons. He was released by the Eskimos on December 4, 2012. Tyler signed with Saskatchewan Roughriders of the CFL in July 2013. The Roughriders won the 101st Grey Cup against the Hamilton Tiger-Cats on November 24, 2013. He was released by the Roughriders on August 13, 2014. On August 27, 2014, he was signed to the practice roster of the Winnipeg Blue Bombers' of the CFL. Tyler played in four games, all starts, for the team in 2014. He played in one game, a start, for the Blue Bombers during the 2015 season. He was released by the team on December 7, 2015.

Personal life
Following a fight that occurred at a Washington, D.C. nightclub in 2011, Tyler was arrested by police and tried for assault, whereupon he was found guilty and sentenced to 90 days in jail in May 2012.

References

External links
Just Sports Stats
Winnipeg Blue Bombers bio

Living people
1986 births
Players of American football from Washington, D.C.
American football offensive linemen
Canadian football offensive linemen
American players of Canadian football
African-American players of American football
African-American players of Canadian football
Temple Owls football players
Arizona Cardinals players
Baltimore Ravens players
Saskatchewan Roughriders players
Edmonton Elks players
Winnipeg Blue Bombers players
21st-century African-American sportspeople
20th-century African-American people